George Patrick O'Neill (21 July 1923 – 2003) was an English footballer who played five games at inside-forward for Port Vale in 1948.

Career
O'Neill played as an amateur with Ellesmere Port Town, before joining Third Division South club Port Vale in November 1948. He made his debut at outside-right in a 2–1 defeat to Notts County at Meadow Lane on 13 November, but broke a toe at his work the following week. He recovered by January the next year, but after failing to nail down a regular spot was released by manager Gordon Hodgson at the end of the 1948–49 season.

Career statistics
Source:

References

1923 births
2003 deaths
Footballers from Liverpool
English footballers
Association football inside forwards
Port Vale F.C. players
English Football League players